Albert William Lowe (born July 24, 1946)  is an American video game designer, programmer, and musician who developed several adventure games, mostly for Sierra On-Line. He is best known for creating the Leisure Suit Larry series. He has also worked as a casting director, voice director, writer, director, producer, background photographer, actor and executive producer.

Career

Teaching, early programming
Lowe began his career teaching public school music for 15 years. After that time, he decided to teach himself programming and in 1982 he created three games for the Apple II: Dragon's Keep, Bop-A-Bet, and Troll's Tale. He was on Name That Tune in the 1984–85 season and was a semifinalist in one of that season's Tournaments of Champions.

Sierra Entertainment bought these games in 1983 and Lowe worked for them as a programmer and game designer for 16 years. His first projects included Winnie the Pooh in the Hundred Acre Wood, Donald Duck's Playground, and The Black Cauldron, all based on Disney properties. Later, he was lead programmer on King's Quest III and Police Quest I and also created the music for other Sierra games. Lowe is best known for his Leisure Suit Larry series of games. After Larry's success, Lowe also designed other games such as Torin's Passage and Freddy Pharkas: Frontier Pharmacist (with Josh Mandel). Throughout his career, Lowe was known for his distinctive bald head, full beard, and considerable beer belly, and liked to call himself "the world's oldest game designer". Next Generation listed Lowe in their "75 Most Important People in the Games Industry of 1995", chiefly for the Leisure Suit Larry series.

Sam Suede: Undercover Exposure
Computer Gaming World reported a rumor in July 1994 that Lowe was working on a new series, Capitol Punishment, with the first game being "Bill and Hillary's Whitewater Adventure". That year he moved with his family to Seattle and supposedly retired in 1998. In a 2006 interview, Al revealed that he was not actually retired, but had spent well over a year secretly designing a new game Sam Suede: Undercover Exposure, an action comedy game developed by iBase Entertainment, which he co-founded with Ken Wegrzyn. Unable to locate a publisher to promote and distribute Sam Suede, iBase Entertainment shut down in December 2006. Following this setback, Lowe expressed serious doubts whether he'd ever reenter the gaming industry again. As of January 2007, the website for Sam Suede developer iBase Entertainment lists the project as postponed pending acquisition of additional development funding.

Later developing
In 2010, Lowe produced and directed Al Lowe's Comedy Club, developed by The Binary Mill for iOS devices. He has since been recruited by Replay Games to work on high-definition remakes of six of the first seven Leisure Suit Larry games (the fourth entry in the series was deliberately skipped as part of the "fifth" game's plot). On December 11, 2013, it was announced that Lowe had left Replay Games and returned to retirement. While Replay Games' official statement claimed that Lowe's departure was amicable, Lowe himself disputed this, stating that the parting did not happen on good terms.

Al Lowe's Sierra Source Code 
In 2018, Lowe posted a listing at popular auction website eBay of an entire backup of his own works at Sierra because he noted that Sierra had no intention of ever backing up any source code. Lowe said, "I backed everything up because I knew Sierra didn't." These included original floppies, boxes, manuals and source code for various games including popular titles such as the original Leisure Suit Larry and Space Quest among others. Shortly after he posted the listing, he sat down for an in depth interview with MetalJesusRocks, a former colleague and ex-Sierra employee where the two had a detailed discussion regarding the entire collection and its ultimate value.

Personal life
Lowe grew up in Chesterfield, Missouri, a suburb of St. Louis. Both Lowe and his wife Margaret, whom he married in 1968, are University of Missouri graduates. During college, Lowe played saxophone in university bands, and after graduation, worked in education as a band director.

Lowe is an avid model railroader and a member of the board of directors of the 4th Division of the Pacific Northwest Region of the National Model Railroad Association. In November 2007, he was the guest of honor at the Alternative Party 2007 in Helsinki, Finland and played saxophone live with David Hasselhoff Big Band. He also runs a website, Al Lowe's Humor Site, and CyberJoke 3000, a daily joke mailing list.

Games

References

External links 

 
 Al Lowe profile at MobyGames

1946 births
American male video game actors
American video game designers
American video game directors
American video game producers
American video game programmers
American casting directors
Leisure Suit Larry
Living people
Place of birth missing (living people)
Sierra On-Line employees
Video game composers
Video game writers
American voice directors